Farmer Bros. Co. is an American coffee foodservice company based in Northlake, Texas. The company specializes in the manufacture and distribution of coffee, tea, and approximately 300 other foodservice items used by restaurants and other establishments. D. Deverl Maserang II serves as the President and CEO of the company.

Company history
In 1912, Roy E. Farmer started a small business roasting coffee beans and selling them door to door in Los Angeles, California. Following a decade of success, Farmer incorporated in 1923 while simultaneously expanding the scope of the company to include the sale of coffee equipment, marked by the acquisition of Western Urn Manufacturing. As the company grew, they began opening branch locations throughout California, quickly establishing a notable presence in developing San Francisco. Starting in the 1930s, Farmer Brothers diversified to include the sale and distribution of not just coffee beans and equipment, but a wider selection of supporting foodservice items.

When Roy E. Farmer died in 1951 at age 59, his son, Roy F. Farmer assumed control of the company. The transition proved hard on the company as the younger Farmer was forced to take the company public in 1952. As Roy F. settled, he was able to greatly improve production efficiency and increase profit margins. In the following years of Roy F. Farmer's tenure as chairman, CEO, and president, the company reached a peak of $240 million in sales in 1998. At this point, the company had nearly 100 branches in 29 states in the Western US. At this same time, however, the company became mired in shareholder unrest; shareholders demanded greater transparency into the company's operations and market strategy, wanted executives to work with Wall Street analysts, and wanted independent directors added to the board. Despite this, the company remained fairly private and closed to the public. At the time of Roy F. Farmer's death in 2004, following a more than 50-year stint heading the company (he was 87) a successor had not been named.

In the years following Farmer's death, Guenter Berger served as chief executive and Roy E. Farmer left the company for a time. Sometime later, Roger M. Laverty III was appointed as CEO and President and during his time as Chief Executive, Farmer Brothers acquired Coffee Bean International and the Direct Store Delivery coffee business of Sara Lee. The later acquisition was for a reported $45 million. He served until April 2011. At that point, Jeffrey Wahba (Treasurer and CFO) and Patrick Criteser (President and CEO of Coffee Bean International) were appointed by the board as co-CEOs on an interim basis.

In March 2012, the company appointed a new CEO and President, Michael Keown. Keown came to the company from WhiteWave Foods, a subsidiary of Dean Foods Company. Then on April 15, 2013, Farmer Bros. appointed Mark Nelson as its new CFO.

On April 28, 2015, Farmer Brothers announced that they will be moving their headquarters from Torrance to Northlake, Texas to save about $12-$15 million annually. President and CEO Mike Keown said "We will relocate our company headquarters to a state-of-the-art facility in a location central to our nation-wide customer base, and provide incremental manufacturing capacity to support future growth." The new Northlake headquarters is scheduled to open in 2016 and will bring 300 new jobs, becoming Northlake's largest employer.

In 2016, Farmer Brothers acquired Boyd's Coffee.

Public Domain Coffee
The acquisition of Coffee Bean International by Farmer Brothers was part of the company's expansion into "specialty coffee". As an outgrowth of that initiative, Public Domain was established in April 2010. A subsidiary of Farmer Brothers, Public Domain is the company's flagship coffeehouse which also serves as a lab and training facility for their baristas. The establishment is nationally recognized and is located in downtown Portland, Oregon (as is the headquarters of Coffee Bean International). In what some reviewers have dubbed a "cautiously designed corporate coffeehouse for high-quality coffee", Farmer Brothers showcases its "top shelf" coffees.

References

Coffee brands
Coffee companies of the United States
Companies based in Torrance, California
Companies based in Texas
American companies established in 1912
Food and drink companies established in 1912
1912 establishments in California
Companies listed on the Nasdaq